Marianna Bronislawa Barbara Palka (born 7 September 1981) is a Scottish actress, producer, director, and writer. She is the writer, director and star of the film Good Dick, which screened at the Sundance Film Festival.

Early life and education 
Palka was born to Polish immigrant parents in Glasgow, Scotland. At the age of 17, Palka moved to New York City to study at the Atlantic Theater Company.

Career 
Palka wrote, directed and starred in Good Dick, which competed in the Dramatic Competition at the 2008 Sundance Film Festival. The film also featured Jason Ritter, Martin Starr, Mark Webber, Charles Durning and Tom Arnold. The New York Times said the film "surmounts its indie-movie quirkiness with exceptional acting and a sincere belief in the salvation of its wounded characters". Palka returned to 2010 Sundance Film Festival as a Juror with the Alfred P. Sloan Foundation.

Palka appeared in Peter Mullan's Neds, Jeremiah Jones' Restive, Bryce Dallas Howard's When You Find Me, Nathan Sutton's Autumn Wanderer and Sylvia Sether's King of Norway. In 2014, Palka produced and was the subject of the HBO Lucy Walker documentary The Lion's Mouth Opens, which follows the process of Palka discovering she has inherited the genetic mutation that causes Huntington’s disease, and which was nominated for an Emmy Award and shortlisted for an Academy Award nomination. Palka made a cameo in the HBO series Girls as Jessa's (Jemima Kirke) sister. As of 2017, Palka appears as Reggie 'Vicky the Viking' Walsh in the Netflix series G.L.O.W .

Palka wrote, directed and starred in Bitch, based on a true story from Scottish doctor R.D. Laing of a mother acting like a dog after a psychotic break. The film made its round in film festivals around the world, after its world premiere at 2017 Sundance Film Festival. In 2017, Palka directed the feature film EGG starring Christina Hendricks, Alysia Reiner and Anna Camp and produced by Michele Ganeless.

Theater 
In 2010, Palka performed in Love, Loss, and What I Wore at The Geffen Playhouse in Los Angeles. In 2012, she was in The Ensemble Theater in Santa Barbara, California, reading of The Good Soldier. She appeared in Martin McDonagh's The Lonesome West at the Actor's Gang Theatre, Los Angeles, and in Conor McPherson's Dublin Carol at the Ensemble Theatre Company.

Awards 
 20YY: Annenberg Film Fellowship
 2008: Sundance Film Festival – Grand Jury Prize, Dramatic (nominee) for Good Dick
 2008: Edinburgh International Film Festival – New Director's Award for Good Dick
 2010: Sundance Film Festival, Alfred P. Sloan Award
 2016: News & Documentary Emmy Awards – Outstanding Short Documentary (nominee) for The Lion's Mouth Opens
 2017: Fantasia Film Festival – Cheval Noir award for Best Screenplay for Bitch
 2017: Neuchâtel International Fantastic Film Festival – Narcisse Award, Best Film (nominee) for Bitch

Filmography 
Creator
 1990s: By My Very Self (Short)
 1990s: For My American Friends (Short)
 2008: Good Dick – as The Woman; producer, director, writer
 2014: I'm the Same – as Skye; co-producer, director, writer
 2014: The Lion's Mouth Opens (Documentary short) – as herself; producer, writer
 2015: Always Worthy – as Genevieve; producer, director, writer
 2016: Heirloom (Short) – as Maid Ivy; writer
 2017: Bitch – as Jill Hart; director, writer
 2018: Egg – director

Actor
 2001: Earth Day (Short) – as Gail (voice)
 2006: Orchids (Short) – as Girl's Feet
 2007: Drunk History (TV series) – as Martha Washington (1 episode: "Drunk History Vol. 3: Featuring Danny McBride")
 2007: Derek and Simon (TV series short) – as Sophie (2 episodes)
 2009: Betty File 43 (Short)
 2010: Neds – as Aunt Beth
 2010: Modern Romance (Short)
 2011: Insane (Short) – as Marianna
 2011: Restive – as Jeva 
 2011: When You Find Me (Short) – as Joanne
 2012: Spoonful (Short) – as Vivian
 2013: Autumn Wanderer – as Audrey
 2013: King of Norway (Short) – as Liv Skaarsguard
 2013: The Price We Pay (Short) – as Hot Chick
 2013: Slice (Short) – as Radio Newscaster
 2014: First Kiss (Short) – as Soko's Kisser
 2015: Pant Suits (Short) – as Joanne 
 2015: Scottish Mussel – as Fiona
 2015: Contracted: Phase II – as Crystal Young
 2015: Oh Gallow Lay (Short)
 2015: Forever – as Kate 
 2016: Girls (TV series) (TV show) – as Minerva (1 episode: "Queen for Two Days")
 2017–19: GLOW (TV series) – as Reggie Walsh (23 episodes)
 2017: We Are Boats – as Marko
 2017: Mississippi Requiem – as Emily Grierson
 2018: The Adventures of Thomasina Sawyer – as Aunt Polly
 2019: Good Omens (TV series) – as Frannie (1 episode: "Hard Times")

Theater
 2006: Dublin Carol by Conor McPherson at the Ensemble Theatre Company
 2010: Love, Loss, and What I Wore at The Geffen Playhouse, Los Angeles
 2012: The Good Soldier reading at The Ensemble Theater, Santa Barbara, California
 2000s: The Lonesome West by Martin McDonagh at The Actors' Gang Theatre, Los Angeles

Sources

External links

 
 

Living people
1981 births
Scottish film actresses
Scottish people of Polish descent
Actresses from Glasgow
Scottish women film directors
Scottish film producers
Writers from Glasgow
Scottish screenwriters
Scottish women photographers
Scottish television actresses
Scottish stage actresses
21st-century Scottish actresses
21st-century women photographers
21st-century British screenwriters
21st-century Scottish women writers
British women screenwriters